USS Density (AM-218) was an Admirable-class minesweeper built for the U.S. Navy during World War II. She was built to clear minefields in offshore waters, and served the Navy in the Pacific Ocean.

She was launched 6 February 1944 by Tampa Shipbuilding Co., Inc., Tampa, Florida; sponsored by Miss M. Farmwald; and commissioned 15 June 1944. She was reclassified MSF-218 on 7 February 1955.

The vessel was later renamed MV Galaxy and was home to the British offshore pirate radio station Radio London.

World War II Pacific Ocean operations 
Density arrived at San Diego, California, 23 September 1944 to serve as a training ship for the Small Craft Training Center at Terminal Island, until 2 February 1945, when she sailed for Pearl Harbor and Ulithi.

Density sortied from Ulithi 19 March 1945 to sweep mines preparatory to the invasion of Okinawa on 1 April. Patrolling off Okinawa for its capture and occupation, Density fired on the enemy in several suicide attacks. On 6 April she splashed several of the kamikaze force which struck the Fleet, then assisted , picking up 16 of her survivors and towing her to Kerama Retto. On the 22nd she splashed an enemy attacker which cleared her bridge by only , then rescued three survivors from stricken  before resuming her patrol. Five days later she recovered the body of an enemy officer from a plane she had downed and thus obtained valuable intelligence material including a secret code book and photographs. While sweeping mines she sank an enemy suicide boat off Naha on 4 May.

Density sailed from Okinawa 4 July to join a group of minesweepers supporting the 3rd Fleet strikes against the Japanese homeland. From 9 August to 28 August she was in San Pedro Bay, Leyte, for brief overhaul, and on 8 September put out from Okinawa to sweep mines in Japanese waters. She remained in the Far East on occupation duty until 20 November when she sailed for the U.S. West Coast, arriving at San Diego, California, 19 December.

Awards 
Density received three battle stars for World War II service.

Post-War decommissioning  
On 29 January 1946 she arrived at Galveston, Texas, to provide services to the reserve fleet at Orange, Texas, and was placed in commission in reserve 14 May 1946. Density was decommissioned there 3 March 1947.

In February 1955 Density was sold by the U.S. Navy to be used as a Greek cargo ship and renamed MV Manoula. By 1964 she was impounded in Miami, Florida, for non-payment of harbour dues.

She was bought in September 1964 and renamed MV Galaxy. She set sail from Miami on 22 October 1964 for England via Puerto Rico and Madeira. The ship arrived in the Thames Estuary on 19 November 1964. Radio Caroline's owner Ronan O'Rahilly warned Radio London that this anchorage might fall within British territorial waters. They responded by moving the ship to a position four-and-a-half miles from Walton-on-the-Naze, Essex, close to Radio Caroline South's ship MV Mi Amigo. Radio London later regularly advertised this position on air as 51° 47.09" N, 01° 20.55" E.

She started broadcasting as Radio London, an offshore commercial station, on 23 December 1964, gaining an estimated 8.8 million listeners aged over 18 in the United Kingdom by 1966. She continued to broadcast until 14 August 1967 when the British Government enacted legislation prohibiting British nationals from working for the station or supplying it. Radio Caroline, operating from two ships at separate locations, was the only offshore station to defy the ban.

On 19 August she sailed to Hamburg. After Radio Caroline's ships were seized over unpaid debts the Galaxy was considered as a replacement, but was too expensive. An attempt by Erwin Meister and Edwin Bollier to buy the ship as a going concern also fell through, and they set about equipping another two ships, the later of which broadcast as Radio North Sea International.

The Galaxy remained in Hamburg until 1970 when she was sold for scrap. She remained in Hamburg until 1975 when she was moved to the shipyard and harbour of Howaldswerke-Deutsche Werft at Kiel. In 1979 she sank and stayed on the bottom until August 1986 when a conservation lobby persuaded the authorities to raise her due to concerns about pollution. She was raised and moved to dry land where she was scrapped.

References

External links 
 

Admirable-class minesweepers
World War II mine warfare vessels of the United States
Ships built in Tampa, Florida
1944 ships